Roger de Lafforest, (11 January 1905, Paris – 16 November 1998), was a French writer. Lafforest has titles published and re-editions since 1927  in Czech, English, French, Portuguese, Slovak, Polish, and Spanish. He was bestowed with the Prix Interallié, a French award of literature in 1939.

Works
 Des égards dus à la jeunesse (Considerations due to youth); co-author Paul Gilson, 1927.
 Kala-azar, 1930.
 Les Figurants de la mort (Death’s Extras), 1939. Reissue Éditions de l'Arbre vengeur, 2009.
 Si le ciel tombe... (If the sky is falling ...), 1942.
 La Cravate de chanvre... (Hemp necktie ...), 1953.
 Les perruques de Don Miguel (Dom Miguel’s wigs), 1955.
 Le sosie du prince (The prince’s double), 1966.
 L'Art et la science de la chance (Art and science of the luck), 1968.
 Ces maisons qui tuent (Houses that kill), 1970.
 La réalité magique (Magical reality), 1977.
 Les lois de la chance (Probability laws), 1978.
 Présence des invisibles (Invisible presences), 1983.
 La Magie des énergies (The magic of the energies), 1985.
 L'effet nocebo (The nocebo effect: Investigating ways and mechanisms of the remote influence), 1989.
 Signé -- Dieu (God’s sign: looking for a digital code to the harmony law which governs the world); co-author Jacques Langlois, 1992.
 L'arme absolue: la prière (The ultimate weapon: the prayer), 2001.

References

External links
A review of Ces maisons qui tuent (Houses That Kill)

20th-century French non-fiction writers
Writers from Paris
1905 births
1998 deaths
Prix Interallié winners
20th-century French male writers